Khaleh Saray-e Panjah va Noh (also Romanized as Khāleh Sarāy-e Panjāh va Noh; also known as Khālehsarā-ye Panjāhonoh) is a village in Khaleh Sara Rural District, Asalem District, Talesh County, Gilan Province, Iran. At the 2006 census, its population was 408, in 100 families.

References 

Populated places in Talesh County